Oliver Gray (born 28 April 2004) is a British racing driver who is currently competing in the 2023 FIA Formula 3 Championship for Carlin, having previously raced for Carlin in the 2022 F4 British Championship, finishing runner-up in the standings. He has been a member of the Williams Driver Academy since March of 2022.

Career

Lower formulae

2021 
Gray began his single-seater career in 2021, driving for Fortec Motorsport in the F4 British Championship.

Racing record

Racing career summary 

* Season still in progress.

Complete F4 British Championship results 
(key) (Races in bold indicate pole position) (Races in italics indicate fastest lap)

Complete Formula 4 UAE Championship results 
(key) (Races in bold indicate pole position) (Races in italics indicate fastest lap)
{| class="wikitable" style="text-align:center; font-size:90%"
!Year
!Team
!1
!2
!3
!4
!5
!6
!7
!8
!9
!10
!11
!12
!13
!14
!15
!16
!17
!18
!19
!20
!DC
!Points
|-
|2022
!Hitech GP
|style="background:#CFCFFF" |YAS11
|style="background:#FFDF9F" |YAS12
|style="background:#CFCFFF" |YAS13
|style="background:#DFFFDF" |YAS14
|style="background:#EFCFFF"|DUB11
|style="background:#DFFFDF"|DUB12
|style="background:#DFFFDF"|DUB13
|style="background:#DFFFDF"|DUB14
|style="background:#"|DUB21
|style="background:#"|DUB22
|style="background:#"|DUB23
|style="background:#"|DUB24
|style="background:#"|DUB31
|style="background:#"|DUB32
|style="background:#"|[[Dubai Autodrome|DUB33]]
|style="background:#"|DUB34
|style="background:#"|YAS21
|style="background:#"|YAS22
|style="background:#"|YAS33
|style="background:#"|YAS44
!15th
!41
|}

 Complete FIA Formula 3 Championship results 
(key) (Races in bold indicate pole position) (Races in italics'' indicate fastest lap)

* Season still in progress.

References

External links 
 

2004 births
Living people
British racing drivers
Italian F4 Championship drivers
British F4 Championship drivers
UAE F4 Championship drivers
FIA Formula 3 Championship drivers
Hitech Grand Prix drivers
Fortec Motorsport drivers
Carlin racing drivers